James Rempe (born November 4, 1947, in Scranton, Pennsylvania, US) is an American professional pocket billiards (pool) player, and was inducted into the Billiard Congress of America's Hall of Fame in 2002.

Career
Rempe began playing pool at the age of 6. he turned pro at the age of 22, winning over 100 tournaments in various pool disciplines. A winner of pocket billiard championship's, in Nine-ball, Eight-ball and Straight Pool. He is also the winner of the first PPPO World Eight-ball Championship in 1985, defeating Joe Barbara in London.

He accumulated many tournament wins in the 1970s throughout the United States, Asia and Europe, thus acquiring the nickname "King James".

In 1979, Rempe went to Australia where he defeated World Snooker Championship finalist Eddie Charlton in a series of Nine-ball, Rotation, and Straight Pool. In 1980, Rempe went to New Zealand where he defeated World Snooker Championship finalist Rex Williams in a series of Snooker, English billiards Nine-ball and Rotation.

He represented the USA three times at the Mosconi Cup, most recently in 1999.

In December 2005, Rempe participated in the International Pool Tour IPT King of the Hill Shootout, an invitational event consisting of thirteen BCA Hall of Famers and thirty other accomplished players, in Orlando, Florida. competed in this historic tournament which was televised on the Versus network.

Snooker
In 1985 Rempe turned professional and from 1985 to 1991 Rempe took part in professional snooker events. He achieved his best result when he reached the round of 64 during the 1987 World Snooker Championship. There he lost against future 7 time world champion Stephen Hendry by 10 frames to 4. In the world snooker rankings, Rempe achieved his highest ranking in 1987 with 101st place, the highest ranking of any American-born player. He is also the only American-born player to record a century break in professional competition.

Titles and achievements

References

External links
 

American pool players
American snooker players
1947 births
Living people
Sportspeople from Scranton, Pennsylvania